This is a list of plantations (including plantation houses) in the U.S. state of Kentucky, which are: National Historic Landmarks, listed on the National Register of Historic Places, listed on a heritage register, or are otherwise significant for their history, association with significant events or people, or their architecture and design.

See also
 List of plantations in the United States
Plantation Complexes in the Southern United States
Plantations in the American South

References

.
Lists of plantation complexes in the United States by state
Plantations
United States economic history-related lists